Idanha, Portugal may refer to:

Idanha-a-Nova Municipality, a municipality in east-central Portugal 
Idanha-a-Nova, a parish within the municipality
Idanha-a-Velha, a parish within the municipality
Castelo de Idanha-a-Velha